Jersey Shore: Family Vacation is an American reality television series that premiered globally on April 5, 2018, on MTV. The series is a revival, sequel, and reunion series of the reality television series Jersey Shore, which ran from 2009 to 2012.

Production
On November 27, 2017, MTV announced that the cast (with the exception of Sammi Giancola) would be reuniting in Miami, Florida, for a new reunion season titled Jersey Shore: Family Vacation. The series premiered globally in nearly 180 countries on April 5, 2018. Most of production took place in Miami, with some additional filming in parts of New Jersey, Staten Island, and Las Vegas. This season also featured a trip to Resorts World Bimini, located in The Bahamas.

On February 28, 2018, a second season was ordered ahead of the series premiere. The second season premiered on August 23, 2018, and began with a vacation to Las Vegas. The remainder of filming took place in various New Jersey locations including Seaside Heights, Atlantic City, Manalapan, and Point Pleasant. The second half of season two premiered on July 11, 2019, and focused around Sorrentino's court sentencing for tax evasion and his wedding. Filming locations included Stony Creek Ranch Resort in Stony Creek, NY, and The Legacy Castle located in Pompton Plains, NJ.

On December 13, 2018, MTV renewed the series for a third season and premiered on August 22, 2019. The third season highlighted Mike going to prison, Ronnie going to rehab, Deena and Nicole's new babies, Jenni's divorce and new boyfriend, Angelina's wedding plans, and Vinny's Chippendales residency. Filming took place in various locations including Los Angeles, Las Vegas, Point Pleasant, Holmdel, and Washington, D.C. The second half of season three premiered on February 27, 2020. It included the celebration of Angelina Pivarnick's bachelorette party and wedding, along with the return of Mike "The Situation" Sorrentino. Filming took place in Manalapan, Asbury Park, New Orleans, and the Park Chateau Estate and Gardens in East Brunswick.

On June 25, 2020, the series was renewed for a fourth season and premiered on November 19, 2020. The season begins with the aftermath of the infamous speech given by Nicole "Snooki" Polizzi, Jenni "JWoww" Farley, and Deena Nicole Cortese at Angelina Pivarnick's wedding. Since the wedding, Snooki decided to leave the show, Jenni and Deena are still not on speaking terms with Angelina, Mike and Lauren are trying to get pregnant, and Pauly has a new girlfriend. All of this builds up to the whole world shutting down due to the COVID-19 pandemic. The fourth season began filming with production in August 2020, during the COVID-19 pandemic. The beginning of the season featured some self-shot footage and Zoom calls with the cast members. After months in quarantine, the cast and crew were back in production at the Hilton Lake Las Vegas Resort on September and October 2020. The entire resort was rented out in order to film within a quarantine bubble adhering to local, state and federal COVID-19 health and safety requirements during their stay. The second half of season four premiered on June 3, 2021. Filming took place at various locations in New Jersey, Las Vegas, and Los Angeles, as well as a vacation to the Woodloch Resort in the Pocono Mountains. It was speculated for Snooki to be making a return to the show in some capacity, after she was spotted having lunch with Angelina in Florham Park, NJ. This was officially confirmed on May 11, 2021, when MTV released the teaser for Season 4B featuring Snooki's return. On April 22, 2021, Ortiz-Magro was arrested for domestic violence. At the time of his arrest, Ortiz-Magro was on probation as a result of his October 2019 domestic violence incident. He was released shortly after on a $100,000 bond. On May 13, 2021, Ortiz-Magro announced that he was stepping back from the show to focus on his mental health.

On September 2, 2021, MTV renewed the series for a fifth season with Snooki returning as a main cast member. The season premiered on January 6, 2022. The first half of season five filmed in New Jersey and Las Vegas as well as a trip to Los Angeles, California, and a vacation to the Florida Keys at the Isla Bella Beach Resort. Filming for the second half of season five resumed shortly after the holidays, with the cast being spotted in El Paso, Texas and later in San Diego, California. The second half of season five premiered on June 23, 2022.

On December 22, 2022, it was announced that the sixth season would premiere on January 26, 2023. The season filmed in various locations across the country including New Jersey, New York City, North Carolina, South Carolina, Connecticut, Los Angeles, Santa Barbara, and New Orleans. Season 6 highlights Guadagnino competing on the thirty-first season of Dancing with the Stars.

On March 11, 2023, it was announced that former castmate, Sammi Giancola would be returning to the series for the second half of the current season.

Cast

Main

Recurring

Episodes

Series overview

Season 1 (2018)

Season 2 (2018–2019)

Season 3 (2019–2020)

Season 4 (2020–2021)

Season 5 (2022)

Season 6 (2023)

Specials

Home media
On September 25, 2018, the first season was released on DVD. On September 29, 2020, the second season was released on DVD. On November 2, 2021, the third season was released on DVD.

Reception

Ratings
 

| link2                 = Jersey Shore: Family Vacation#Season 2 (2018–2019)
| episodes2             = 27
| start2                = August 23, 2018
| startrating2          = 1.36
| end2                  = August 15, 2019
| endrating2            = 1.01
| season2               = 2018–19
| viewers2              = |2}} 

| link3                 = Jersey Shore: Family Vacation#Season 3 (2019-2020)
| episodes3             = 29
| start3                = August 22, 2019
| startrating3          = 0.94
| end3                  = June 18, 2020
| endrating3            = 1.09
| season3               = 2019–20
| viewers3              = |2}} 

| link4                 = Jersey Shore: Family Vacation#Season 4 (2020-2021)
| episodes4             = 28
| start4                = November 19, 2020
| startrating4          = 0.90
| end4                  = September 2, 2021
| endrating4            = 0.41
| season4               = 2020–21
| viewers4              = |2}} 

| link5                 = Jersey Shore: Family Vacation#Season 5 (2022)
| episodes5             = 31
| start5                = January 6, 2022
| startrating5          = 0.59
| end5                  = October 20, 2022
| endrating5            = 0.27
| season5               = 2021–22
| viewers5              =

| link6                 = Jersey Shore: Family Vacation#Season 6 (2023)
| episodes6             = 
| start6                = January 26, 2023
| startrating6          = 0.51
| end6                  = 
| endrating6            = 
| season6               = 2022–23
| viewers6              =

}}

Awards and nominations

References

External links
 
 

2010s American reality television series
2018 American television series debuts
2020s American reality television series
MTV reality television series
Television series about vacationing
Television shows filmed in Miami
Television shows set in Miami
American sequel television series
Television shows filmed in New Jersey